Sugar Loaf Express is a direct to disc studio album by jazz guitarist Lee Ritenour that was released in 1977.

Track listing
"Sugar Loaf Express"
"Morning Glory"
"That's the Way of the World"
"Slippin' in the Back Door"
"Tomorrow"
"Lady Soul"

Musicians
 Lee Ritenour – guitar
 Eric Gale – guitar
 Abraham Laboriel – bass guitar
 Patrice Rushen – piano, electric piano
 Harvey Mason – drums
 Steve Forman – percussion

1977 albums
Lee Ritenour albums